Get With the Rhythm is the first studio album release by Rhythm & News, in 1990.

Track listing

Music videos
"Looking for Love"

References

1990 debut albums
Rhythm & News albums